Secor Metropark is a regional park in Richfield Township and Sylvania Township, Ohio, owned and managed by Metroparks Toledo. The park is in the Oak Openings Region.

Features
The park holds the most dogwoods of anywhere in Northwest Ohio, and most of Secor's tree trunks are buttressed—have extra wide bases—in order to remain stable in the park's swampy soil.

Wolfinger Cemetery, a burial site of Richfield Township's first settlers, is also held inside the park's boundaries.

The park is the former home of the National Center for Nature Photography.

References

External links
Metroparks Toledo
Park Map

Parks in Toledo, Ohio
Metroparks Toledo
Protected areas of Lucas County, Ohio